Bhotechaur is a village in Sindhupalchok District in the Bagmati Zone of central Nepal. At the time of the 1991 Nepal census it had a population of 4995 and had 870 houses in the village.

Kundeshowri Temple 
Bhotechaur is famous for the Shiva Mandir called Kundeshowri(Kunda - pound) Temple, which is located in Bhanjang village on the bank of the Jarke River. This temple also touches the border of Kathmandu district and is 200 meters away from Bansbari VDC, Sindupalchok.

Everest Tea Garden 
Bhotechaur is known for the tea garden which is known as Everest Tea Garden.
Everest Tea Garden, which is also known as “Mini Ilam” lies in jyotish gaun, a village 5km away from botechaur bazar, is now a traveling destination of the people of Kathmandu valley for picnics, photo shoots, refreshment visits as well as one night stay.

References

Populated places in Sindhupalchowk District